Royal Rosarian is an outdoor 2011 bronze sculpture by American artist Bill Bane, located at the International Rose Test Garden, Washington Park in Portland, Oregon, United States.

Description and history
Royal Rosarian, designed by Oregon artist Bill Bane, was installed in Washington Park in 2011, becoming the park's third bronze sculpture. Depicting a Royal Rosarian tipping his hat, the sculpture measures  x  x . It cost $41,000 and was commissioned by the Rosarians and the Royal Rosarian Foundation to commemorate the civic group's 100th anniversary. A dedication ceremony was held in October 2011, beginning a series of celebrations associated with the organization's centennial. The statue was presented to City Commissioner Nick Fish as a gift to Portland from the Royal Rosarians. It is owned by the City of Portland.

See also

 2011 in art

References

2011 establishments in Oregon
2011 sculptures
Bronze sculptures in Oregon
Outdoor sculptures in Portland, Oregon
Sculptures of men in Oregon
Statues in Portland, Oregon
Washington Park (Portland, Oregon)